Wandsworth Stadium was a greyhound racing stadium in Wandsworth.

Origins
The stadium was constructed on an area of unused land south of the Wandsworth reservoir between Garratt Lane (formerly South Street) and Buckhold Road. Just to the south was King Georges Park (a public nursery, tennis courts, bowls green, swimming and paddling pools). This tranquil setting was unfortunately ruined by an unsightly storm relief sewage aqueduct that ran straight over and through the middle of it.

Opening 
Wandsworth stadium cost £100,000 to build and could accommodate 20,000 spectators; either side of the track were two large covered stands that could each seat 7,000 people. The stadium opened on Saturday 15 April 1933, accompanied by the HM Scots Guards band.

The local Borough News reported that a former Chelsea player Alex Jackson had bought a greyhound called Jovial Honey and was keen for the Wandsworth management to consider allowing football to be played at the stadium. The stadium was reputed to have created dozens of jobs for Wandsworth residents during a difficult time that was known as the Great Depression in the United Kingdom.

History
In 1936 rival gangs fought a battle in front of thousands of witnesses and one man was murdered after being stabbed to death. However racing soon returned to normal trading and in 1938 the Eclipse was introduced which would become a prominent competition in the racing calendar. War disrupted regular racing but in August 1942 when the great wartime greyhound Ballynennan Moon appeared at the track he broke the track record over 440 yards.

In 1945 the Daily Herald reported that Wandsworth Stadium Ltd (the company that owned the track) was subject to over 97% government tax deductions. Sidney Parkes the owner of the company revealed that gross profit was £430,000 of which £420,000 was taken by the government in various taxes leaving just £10,000 net profit. He stated "What a money making proposition dog racing is to the Labour government."

The following summer (1946) greyhound racing experienced an extraordinary high with phenomenal attendances, the attendance figures for 1946 (licensed tracks only) topped 50 million and tote returns were in excess of £196 million (£196,431,430.00). It was during this period that a company called London Stadiums Ltd brokered a deal to take over Wandsworth Stadium Ltd, Park Royal Stadium Ltd and Charlton Stadium (1936) Ltd. The three companies that were taken over all received shares in London Stadiums Ltd.

Wandsworth transported their racing hounds from the track kennels to the race track by using a 'Scammell Mechanical Horse' that pulled a trailer of 56 greyhounds housed in their individual cages.

In 1947 a greyhound called Motts Regret reached the Wandsworth Spring Stakes final where he finished second to Balmaha. Motts regret would change his name to Trevs Perfection, the 1947 English Greyhound Derby winner. The same year another major competition was introduced called the Olympic, this race paired with the Eclipse would result in many of the sport's top hounds frequenting the track.

The Director of Racing for all of the London Stadiums Ltd tracks was Mr R E C Parkes and Racing Manager at Wandsworth was Mr K A Guy. Bill Francis was an Assistant Racing Manager in the late fifties.

In 1955 Wandsworth hurdle grader Moyshna Queen starred alongside Frankie Howerd in a film called Jumping for Joy. The bitch was called Lindy Lou in the film.

In 1961 Charles Boulton replaced Mr Guy as Racing Manager and his assistant was John Rowe who would soon become the Leicester Stadium Racing Manager. One year later Charlton closed temporarily following difficulties and the Cloth of Gold competition was switched to sister track Wandsworth. Trainers at the track in 1965 were Hourigan, Nattriss, O’Shaughnessy, Holyhead and Bill Cowell.

Sunbury Kennels
All three stadia, Wandsworth, Park Royal and Charlton Stadium were served by the Sunbury Kennels, which were located in a rural setting on Hanworth Road in Sunbury-on-Thames twelve miles from Park Royal Stadium. The kennels which were built in 1933 at the cost of £25,000 sat in fourteen acres and had accommodation for 600 greyhounds. In addition to the kennels there was a veterinary surgery including X-ray, Ultraviolet and Infrared ray apparatus, with the kennel staff and veterinary surgeon living on site. The self-contained exercising grounds included over three quarters of a mile of special track for road work. The establishment had its own kitchens, bakery and isolation kennels (for sickness). One of the early kennel managers was Mr Cadwallader who organised 12 trainers (4 per stadium), each with their own stadium related section. Total staff numbered 80 and the kennels were seen as the equivalent for London Stadiums Ltd that the Hook Estate and Kennels was for the Greyhound Racing Association.

Closure 
News broke in January 1963 that London Stadiums Ltd had future plans to redevelop the stadium into a shopping centre.

Wandsworth closed on 4 June 1966 stating that it could not compete with big local tracks, West Ham, Walthamstow, Wembley and White City but this was a smokescreen with plans afoot to sell the stadium and prime land for re-development. The American style Arndale Centres had first been introduced to the UK in 1961 and the pedestrianised mall type centre was constructed in Wandsworth in quick time. The centre still exists today and is called the Southside shopping centre.

Achievements 
In 1941 Miss D Thomas trained Heavy Damages to Guineas glory at Park Royal Stadium. In 1947 Rowley won the Hunt Cup for Wandsworth trainer O’Shaughnessy. An event held near Cambridge in 1953 called the 'London Tracks Coursing Cup' went to Must Venture trained by Bill Cowell at Wandsworth.

Competitions

The Olympic

Cloth of Gold
			
(1941-61 Charlton 600 yards), (1962-65 Wandsworth 650 yards), (1966-68 Charlton 600 yards)

Track records

References

Defunct greyhound racing venues in the United Kingdom
Defunct greyhound racing venues in London
Greyhound racing in London